Marsipankake, also known as marzipan princess cake or hvit dame kake, is a dessert from Norway featuring layers of sponge cake, vanilla cream, various puddings, jams, and other additives before being topped in a layer of marzipan.

History 
The name of the cake was coined by the German Kaiser Wilhelm II on a trip to Bergen. During his visits, he would be served marsipankake, in which he would respond with, "Ah, nochmal die weisse Dame," or, "Ah, again the white lady." While originating in Bergen, the cake has since found its way to bakeries across Norway and other Scandinavian regions.

See also 
 List of Norwegian desserts
 Norwegian cuisine

References 

Norwegian cuisine